The community of San Juan de Dios de Anton, located in the Antón District, Cocle Province in Republic of Panama. Originally it was named San Juan after a river that had the same name, but this was later changed to Santo Patrono.

San Juan de Dios

It has access via a new paved road to El Valle de Anton.
It has:
Creeks and Rivers
Asphalt road
Electricity
Telefónica good sign
Spa
Bridge over creek
Siembros fruit and timber
Good wind regime

Communities
 Neighborhoods include:
Entradero
Los Meneses
1 and 2 Chorrerita
Salao
Los Martinez
Estancia
Los Reyes

Schools
The community of San Juan de Dios has two school for its inhabitants:
IB Primary Entradero
High School San Juan de Dios

Culture
Celebrations of St John of God:
Semana Santa
San Juan de Dios, March 8
On the cross, May
Santa Rosa, August 30

References

Populated places in Coclé Province